Risti is a small borough in Lääne-Nigula Parish, Lääne County, in western Estonia.

Before 20 October 2013, Risti was the administrative centre of Risti Parish.

Gallery

References

External links
Risti Parish 

Boroughs and small boroughs in Estonia
Governorate of Estonia